Enniskerry (historically Annaskerry, from ) is a village in County Wicklow, Ireland. The population was 1,889 at the 2016 census.

Location

The R117 road, colloquially known as "The Twenty-One Bends" connects the town to the main N11 road to Dublin. The 185 Go-Ahead Ireland route connects the village hourly to Bray, the nearest large town. The 44 Dublin Bus route connects the village with Dublin city centre.

History

Enniskerry is a planned estate village dating from the 1840s, with the original buildings designed in a neo-Tudor style.

The Protestant population of the village attended church in the grounds of the Powerscourt Demesne until 1859. Mervyn Wingfield, 7th Viscount Powerscourt built a new church, Saint Patrick's, in the village which was completed two years later, in 1861. This coincided with an extensive renovation programme that also established the Italian gardens at Powerscourt. The Viscount Powerscourt claimed the old church following the disestablishment of the Church of Ireland by the Irish Church Act 1869. The consequences were that only those with a right to be buried next to the old church within the Demesne could claim these rights thereafter.

Powerscourt Estate, comprising a large house and gardens today occupying , is located near the town and is a popular visitor attraction. The extensive formal gardens form the grounds of an 18th-century Palladian house, designed by Richard Cassels, which was destroyed by fire in 1974, and lay as a shell until extensive restorations were carried out in 1996. Powerscourt Waterfall in the grounds of the estate, at 121 metres, is the highest waterfall in Ireland.

Culture

Film

In 1944, Enniskerry was the setting for some scenes of Laurence Olivier's film adaptation of Henry V.

Johnny Nobody (released in 1961) was partly filmed in Enniskerry.

Scenes from a number of other films, including P.S I Love You (2007)  Into the West (1992) and Leap Year (2010) were also shot locally.

Scenes for the 2022 Disney film Disenchanted were shot in Enniskerry.

Television
From 1996 to 2001, along with Avoca, County Wicklow, it played host to the television series Ballykissangel. On 16 March 2009, Meredith Vieira and Al Roker broadcast live in Enniskerry for NBC's Today Show.

Transport
The Bray and Enniskerry Railway was proposed in the 19th century, to link the town to Bray. Some initial work was carried out, including building a bridge to carry the railway over Dublin Corporation's Vartry watermain. Wicklow County Council recently removed much of the railway embankment in road widening, but left the bridge, which is directly opposite the ornate bridge carrying the watermain over the Cookstown River, a tributary of the River Dargle. The plan ran into financial difficulties, and the rails were lifted and sold off.
The 44 Bus to DCU now has a terminus in Enniskerry, whilst the 185 Bus to Bray goes through the village.

Sports
There are two soccer clubs located in the village; Enniskerry Football Club and Enniskerry Youth Club.

Enniskerry Football Club was founded in the early 1970s as Enniskerry Schoolboys Football Club. The club, which now fields teams of boys and girls, is based in the Bog Meadow. Enniskerry FC participates in the Metropolitan Girls League with all-girls teams, the Wicklow Schoolboys/Girls Soccer League for their all-boys teams and the Athletic Union League for the men's team.

Enniskerry Youth Club have several teams playing at adult and youth level.

There is also a Gaelic football club in the village.

Religion
Strong ecumenical links have been forged over the years between the Roman Catholic parish of St Mary and the Church of Ireland parish of St Patrick, Powerscourt, both in the village of Enniskerry. For Volkstrauertag 2022, the Roman Catholic priest Bernard Kennedy led his congregation in "an Ecumenical prayer for peace with interfaith elements," joining Lutheran, Catholic and Jewish communities in Enniskerry. Other clergymen have previously spoken out about the strong ties that exist between Christian communities in the area.

People
Chris de Burgh, singer and songwriter
Ina Boyle, 20th century composer, was born locally
Rosanna Davison, former Miss World.
Rick Savage, bassist with Def Leppard, lived in the town.

See also
 Powerscourt Estate
 Powerscourt Waterfall
 List of towns and villages in Ireland

References

External links

Enniskerry at Wicklow County Tourism

Towns and villages in County Wicklow
Planned communities in the Republic of Ireland